Anion exchange protein 2 (AE2) is a membrane transport protein that in humans is encoded by the SLC4A2 gene. AE2 is functionally similar to the Band 3 Cl−/HCO3− exchange protein.

Mice have been used to explore the function of AE2. AE2 contributes to basolateral membrane HCO3− transport in the gastrointestinal tract. AE2 is required for spermiogenesis in mice. AE2 is required for normal osteoclast function. The activity of AE2 is sensitive to pH.

AE3 has been suggested as a target for prevention of diabetic vasculopathy.

See also
 Solute carrier family

References

Further reading

Solute carrier family